Nie zhai may refer to:

Educated Youth (novel), a 1991 Chinese novel by Ye Xin
Sinful Debt, a 1995 Chinese TV series based on Ye's novel
Sinful Debt 2, a 2010 television sequel